The Östersund Ski Stadium is a cross-country skiing, biathlon, and ski orienteering facility in Östersund, Sweden. In October 2013 it was appointed national stadium for Swedish biathlon. Since 2007 the stadium always has snow since 1 November, using leftover snow gathered by Östersund Municipality over the spring and summertime season.

Major events
 Biathlon World Championships 1970
 Biathlon World Championships 2008
 Biathlon World Championships 2019
 Biathlon World Cup round (recurring)
 World Ski Orienteering Championships 2004

References

External links

Skiing in Sweden
Sport in Östersund
Buildings and structures in Jämtland County
Biathlon in Sweden
Ski stadiums in Sweden